Mercury Rising is a 1998 American action thriller film starring Bruce Willis and Alec Baldwin. Directed by Harold Becker, the movie is based on Ryne Douglas Pearson's 1996 novel originally published as Simple Simon, which was the working title of the film. Willis plays Art Jeffries, an undercover FBI agent who protects a nine-year-old autistic boy, Simon Lynch (played by Miko Hughes), who is targeted by government assassins after he cracks a top secret government code.

The film was released on April 3, 1998. It received mostly negative reviews and grossed $93 million at the box office.

Plot
 

A nine-year-old boy with autism, Simon Lynch, is given a sophisticated puzzle book by his teacher. Simon quickly solves a particular puzzle and phones a number encoded in the solution. This call reaches two National Security Agency cryptographers, Dean Crandell and Leo Pedranski, who created the new cypher Simon has cracked. Pedranski and Crandell report the situation to their boss, Lieutenant Colonel Nick Kudrow, who severely rebukes the pair for their unauthorized actions, describing Simon and his abilities as a national security threat. Two assassins, Peter Burrell and Shayes, are sent by Kudrow to terminate the boy and his parents, Martin and Jenny. Posing as a police detective, Burrell murders both Simon's mother and father, but is unable to find Simon.

FBI agent Art Jeffries, who was recently demoted to a desk job after an unsuccessful negotiation during a bank robbery hostage situation, is sent to investigate and finds Simon in a hidden crawl space in his bedroom closet. Simon is taken to a protection ward at the hospital, where a nurse explains to Art about Simon's autism, and probably can't be questioned. Burrell impersonates a doctor and makes another attempt on Simon's life. Art saves Simon and flees the premises, and tries unsuccessfully to convince Simon that he is a friend instead of a stranger. Later, while on a train, Burrell’s partner, Shayes, tries to kill Simon, but Art intervenes, eventually managing to knock him off the train and onto the tracks just before another locomotive passes, running Shayes over and instantly killing him.

The NSA, under Kudrow's direction, frames Art as the kidnapper of Simon. However, fellow agent and friend Tommy Jordan doesn't believe the story and assists Art, who borrows Jordan's car and takes Simon back to his house. Simon again calls the telephone number written into the code and Art is able to talk to Crandell and Pedranski. As Crandell arranges a meeting at the Wrigley Building by the next morning, Art goes to the meeting, leaving Simon under the care of a woman in a coffee shop, Stacey Siebring, who later reluctantly agrees to help Art take care of Simon. Art and Dean meet and Crandell tells Jeffries about Mercury and Kudrow, but is shot dead by Burrell before he can reveal everything.

Meanwhile, Pedranski, having learned Crandell's fate, tries to reveal Kudrow's unlawful actions by writing letters on a typewriter: one to Art and a carbon copy for the Senate Oversight Committee, but Burrell tracks Pedranski down and kills him as well, confiscating the letters. However, the assassin overlooks Pedranski's carbon copies, which his girlfriend, NSA analyst Emily Lang, takes to the FBI. Jordan discreetly arranges for her to meet with Art to show them the carbon copies; covered in Pedranski’s fingerprints, they become crucial evidence. Art then goes to Kudrow’s home during his birthday party, and demands that Kudrow announce on national TV that the Mercury Encryption Project is a failure.

Under Art's suggestion, Jordan arranges for Simon to go into the Witness Protection Program, but Kudrow, unwilling to reveal his failure and determined to kill Simon, forcibly takes charge of the Witness Protection while revealing to Lomax, the FBI Special Agent in charge, that Jordan forged the witness protection documents. However, unknown to Kudrow, Tommy shows the carbon paper evidence to Lomax and confirms that the fingerprint markings on it were Pedranski's, now fully validating the evidence against Kudrow. Stacey and Simon leave for the pick-up point, at the top of a skyscraper, where Kudrow and Burrell prepare to take Simon away on a helicopter, but Jeffries, with Jordan and an FBI task force's help, sets a trap at the meeting spot. A gunfight ensues between Burrell and the FBI, ending with Burrell being fatally slashed by glass shards when plexiglass windows are blown inward, while Art fights Kudrow one-on-one, and Simon assists him by retrieving his gun. In a last-ditch effort, Kudrow attempts to throw Simon off the roof, but Jeffries shoots him multiple times, and the corrupt NSA chief falls off the edge and to his death through a glass ceiling.

Art and Siebring later visit Simon (now living with foster parents) at his school. Simon embraces Art as a welcome friend, having finally accepted him as a person he trusts.

Cast

Production

Development 
Barry Sonnenfeld was initially slated to direct the film, but due to commitments to Men in Black dropped out and was replaced with Harold Becker.

Casting
Prior to Bruce Willis being cast, Nicolas Cage   and George Clooney were also considered for the lead.

Release

Home media

Mercury Rising was released for VHS and DVD on September 15, 1998. The Collector's Edition and DTS versions for DVD were released in 1999. A Blu-ray with Multi-Format was released on September 14, 2010, and the Double Feature with the film and The Jackal was also released for Blu-ray on March 22, 2011.

Reception

Box office
The film earned $10,104,715 in its opening weekend in 2,386 theaters. Altogether, the film grossed $32,935,289 in the United States and $60,172,000 internationally for a total of $93,107,289.

Critical response
On Rotten Tomatoes the film has a score of 21% based on reviews from 57 critics with an average rating of 4.37/10. The consensus states: "Mercury Rising lays the action on thick, but can never find a dramatic pulse to keep viewers -- or Bruce Willis -- engaged with its maudlin story." Audiences polled by CinemaScore gave the film an average grade of "B" on an A+ to F scale.

Roger Ebert gave the film two stars out of four, writing: "Mercury Rising is about the most sophisticated cryptographic system known to man, and about characters considerably denser than anyone in the audience. Sitting in the dark, our minds idly playing with the plot, we figure out what they should do, how they should do it, and why they should do it, while the characters on the screen strain helplessly against the requirements of the formula." James Berardinelli rated it one and a half out of four stars, saying: "The script for Mercury Rising is exceptionally tiresome and hard-to-swallow. ... Once again, certain standby plot elements -- the high-level government conspiracy and the maverick law enforcement agent -- are recycled, and not to good effect. While Bruce Willis can play the action hero as well as anyone in Hollywood, this particular outing leaves him marooned in situations that are characterized by too little tension and too much nonsense."

Accolades
Bruce Willis received the 1999 Golden Raspberry Award as Worst Actor for his performance (as well as for Armageddon and The Siege). 
Miko Hughes won the category of Best Performance in a Feature Film—Leading Young Actor at the 1999 Young Artist Awards for his portrayal of Simon.

See also
 Mental calculators in fiction
 RSA Secret-Key Challenge

References

External links
 
 
 
 

1998 films
1998 action thriller films
1998 crime drama films
1990s action drama films
American action thriller films
American crime drama films
American political thriller films
American thriller drama films
Cryptography in fiction
Films about autism
Films about the Federal Bureau of Investigation
Films about the National Security Agency
Films about murder
Films about orphans
Films about witness protection
Films based on American crime novels
Films directed by Harold Becker
Films produced by Brian Grazer
Films scored by John Barry (composer)
Films set in Chicago
Films set in South Dakota
Films shot in Chicago
Films shot in South Dakota
Golden Raspberry Award winning films
Imagine Entertainment films
Techno-thriller films
Universal Pictures films
1990s English-language films
1990s American films